Isla de Cañas may refer to: 
Isla de Cañas, Argentina
Isla de Cañas, Los Santos, Panama